The ''Shamrock'' class was a Royal Navy class of six 8 or 10-gun schooners built under contract in Bermuda during the Napoleonic War. The class was an attempt by the Admiralty to harness the expertise of Bermudian shipbuilders who were renowned for their fast-sailing craft. The Admiralty ordered all six vessels  in February 1808.

The vessels were all constructed of Bermuda cedar. This durable, native wood, abundant in Bermuda, was strong and light, and did not need seasoning. Shipbuilders used it for framing as well as planking, which reduced vessel weight. It was also highly resistant to rot and marine borers, giving Bermudian vessels a potential lifespan of twenty years and more, even in the worm-infested waters of the Chesapeake and the Caribbean.

Of the six vessels in the class, four were lost to the perils of the sea; two survived to be sold in 1814 and 1815.

Ships

Citations

References
  

 
+
Ship classes of the Royal Navy
Schooner classes